is a former governor of Wakayama Prefecture in Japan. He was first elected in 2006 and served for four terms until 2022.

Education 
Nisaka graduated with a B.A. in economics from the University of Tokyo in 1974 and entered MITI that same year.

Career 

Yoshinobu Nisaka has been involved in many positions in the Japanese government. From August 2003 to October 2006, Nisaka was Ambassador of Japan to Brunei Darussalam.

References 

Kyoto University alumni
University of Tokyo alumni
People from Wakayama (city)
1950 births
Living people
Governors of Wakayama Prefecture
Ambassadors of Japan to Brunei
Politicians from Wakayama Prefecture